The Group was an Australian situation comedy series produced by Cash Harmon Television for the Seven Network in 1971.

Synopsis
The situation involved five young flatmates—three men and two women—living together for financial and pragmatic reasons and regularly attempting to outwit their landlord who was convinced there were saucy goings-on in the flat.

The regular characters were named on screen with a freeze frame as they made their entrance at the start of each episode. Each credit also featured a brief description of the character, such as MARK the medical student, JENNIFER the student, BOB the accountant, JEREMY he's something in television, TINTO the landlord.

The final character was Laura Bent, the dumb brunette, a model unaware of her physical attractiveness. Laura was the key character around which most of the show's situations revolved. Her caption would change every episode and formed the title of the episode, such as "and LAURA this week she's on a diet", "This Week She Wants to Be a Singer", "This Week She Travels", etc.

Cast members
The regular cast where Ken James as Mark, Jenee Walsh as Jennifer, Gregory Ross as Bob, Gregory de Polnay as Jeremy,  and Terry O'Neill (actor) as Tinto.

The role of Laura Bent was played by Roslyn Wilson, a newcomer whom had no prior acting experience. She was cast at the last minute when the original actress, Wendy Hughes who played Laura in the televised pilot episode, was released to take a role in a theatre production.

Production personnel
The series was produced by Don Cash and Bill Harmon,  devised by Anne Hall and written by David Sale, who the following year collaborated on the phenomenally successful soap opera Number 96. Despite its popularity The Group was not renewed beyond its original series of 13 half-hour episodes.

Indeed many of the actors who had featured briefly in The Group including Bettina Welch, Elisabeth Kirkby and Tom Oliver, would become staples in Number 96

See also 
 List of Australian television series

Notes

External links 
 
The Group at Classic Australian Television

Australian television sitcoms
1971 Australian television series debuts
1971 Australian television series endings
Seven Network original programming
Television series by Cash Harmon Television